Gary Plummer may refer to:

 Gary Plummer (basketball), Israeli-American basketball player
 Gary Plummer (American football), American football player
 Gary Plummer (politician), Maine State Senator